Bulimba Creek, originally known as Doboy Creek or Doughboy Creek, is a perennial stream that is a tributary of the Brisbane River, located in suburban Brisbane in the South East region of Queensland, Australia.

Course and features
It then flows in a northerly direction through the suburbs of Mansfield, Mackenzie, Carindale, Murarrie and Lytton, before meeting the Brisbane River via the Aquarium Passage along the Lytton Reach. The creek has six tributaries: Mimosa Creek, Spring Creek, Salvin Creek, Phillips Creek, Tingalpa Creek and Lindum Creek. There are also a number of significant wetlands systems in the catchment, including Runcorn Wetlands in the upper catchment and Numgubbah, Tingalpa, Doboy and Lindum Wetlands in the lower catchment.

The creek is currently impacted primarily by urban and industrial development. In the past the creek corridor was extensively cleared for cropping and then grazing in the early part of the last century with some remnant vegetation remaining. In some areas the reduction in rural industries has allowed riparian vegetation to regrow.

The catchment has a nature reserve network, mainly of protected hills, including Karawatha Forest, Toohey Forest Conservation Park and Mt Gravatt Outlook, Belmont Hills, Whites Hill and Pine Mountain, Seven Hills and Oates Hill. The creek feeds the Runcorn Water Reserve, Tingalpa Wetlands, Nungubba Swamp, Dairy Swamp, Lyndon Wetlands, Iona Wetlands, The Bulimba Creek Oxbow and Minnippi Parklands.

Fauna and flora

Introduced
The invasive fish species tilapia is present in the waterway. The creek suffers from the introduction of the waterway weed called salvinia first identified in the catchment in 1953.

Threatened
Many of the nature reserves have threatened species. For example, is Whites Hill the powerful owl, grey-headed flying fox, velvet gecko and grey goshawk are all threatened. Flora at risk includes Shirley's tuckeroo and Macadamia integrifolia.

Karawatha Forest is the reserve with the highest number of species and has five different species of glider possums. It also has a fauna overpass constructed over the four lane road, along with underpasses, rope ladders and exclusion funnelling fencing. The project was undertaken by The Griffith University Fauna Unit and Dr Darryl Jones.

History
The indigenous clans of the Yuggera and Turrbal people lived in or traversed parts of the Bulimba Creek catchment for at least twenty thousand years. The first recorded use of the name Bulimba Creek occurred in 1888.

In the late 1860s the Walrus, a large paddle steamer built at Cleveland, was converted to Australia's first floating distillery with the addition of a steam driven sugar mill on board. The Walrus navigated the lower reaches of Bulimba Creek and the Brisbane River before servicing areas along the Nerang, Albert and the Logan Rivers to the south.

In order to provide a straighter deeper channel in the lower reaches Brisbane River, it was decided in 1889 to relocate the mouths of creeks and eliminate all of islands by a combination of removal by dredging and incorporation as part of the river bank.

In August 2008 the Bulimba Creek valley was polluted by a vast  oil leak from the 1964-laid Santos-owned  to Brisbane pipeline adjacent to Bulimba Creek at Carindale, requiring the removal of hundreds of truckloads of contaminated soil from the suburb's recreation reserve.

Bulimba Creek Catchment Coordinating Committee
The Bulimba Creek Catchment Coordinating Committee is associated with the Landcare Group and is run by volunteers. Formed in 1997 and incorporated in 1999, it supports smaller groups and individuals involved in Bushcare, Catchment Care, Nature conservation and environmental education and awareness.

Known as the B4C, the group is involved in protecting and rehabilitating waterways, corridors, remnant bushlands and wetlands. It was the first urban Queensland group to win a State Landcare award in 2000. In 2005 the B4C won the prestigious Thiess National Riverprize. Recent successes in protecting the environment by the B4C include securing the Weekes Road, Carindale Bushlands and Oates Hill Reserve from the Queensland Government, saving the Wishart Bushlands from development, saving the Bulimba Creek Oxbow and negotiating a major rehabilitation project to restore this  saline wetland.

The B4C has its own foundation "the Bulimba Creek Environment Fund", which provides small  grants to members of the community to get involved in environmental issues, education and training. B4C has its own catchment centre and community nursery. It is in the process of developing a  site together with its corporate partner, Powerlink, into a sustainability centre, inclusive of a sustainable home (office),community nursery, with waterwise gardens and through the use of permaculture methods and sustainable technologies.

See also

Brisbane native plants

References

External links

Tributaries of the Brisbane River
Geography of Brisbane
Rivers of Brisbane